Menoikio (also known to the local populations as "Bozdakas" and "Bozdas", Greek corruptions of the Turkish name "Boz Dag", which was applied to the mountain by the Turks in Ottoman time, Zmiynitsa) is a mountain range in the eastern Serres and western Drama regional units in Greece. The highest peak of the mountain is Mavromata at 1,963 m.

Geography

To the west, it is connected with the Vrontous mountain range and to the north via the Mavro Vouno mountain to Orvilos. Menoikio is mostly composed of marble and is almost entirely deforested.

The nearest significant settlements are Serres, Nea Zichni, Emmanouil Pappas and Agio Pnevma to the south and Alistrati and Mikropoli to the west and north. Otherwise the mountain is among the least populated in the Balkans.

History
On the mountain is testified the existence, in the Roman (imperial) times, of marble quarries and iron mines.

A notable landmark of the mountain is the Byzantine monastery of John the Baptist (founded in 1270), 8 km to the north of the city of Serres. Gennadius, the first Ecumenical Patriarch after the Fall of Constantinople, after his resignation in 1465 lived as monk in the monastery, ended his days and was buried there in 1473. His relics were exhumed in 1854 and the following epigram was erected in the place where his grave stood:

See also
 List of mountains in Greece

References

External links
 Orvilos - Menoikio - Vrontou (Lailias) terrain map by Geopsis

Landforms of Drama (regional unit)
Landforms of Serres (regional unit)
Mountain ranges of Greece
Geography of Macedonia (region)
Landforms of Central Macedonia
Landforms of Eastern Macedonia and Thrace
Rhodope mountain range